Cidálio Caetano (born 22 January 1952) is a Portuguese long-distance runner. He competed in the marathon at the 1984 Summer Olympics.

References

1952 births
Living people
Athletes (track and field) at the 1984 Summer Olympics
Portuguese male long-distance runners
Portuguese male marathon runners
Olympic athletes of Portugal
Place of birth missing (living people)